The Jameela Stakes is an American Thoroughbred horse race held annually in August at Laurel Park Racecourse in Laurel, Maryland. It is open to fillies and mare three years old and up and is raced on turf. For 2016, the distance is 6 furlongs.

The race was named in honor of Jameela, whose name is Arabic for "beautiful." Jameela was the first Maryland-bred horse to go over the $1,000,000.00 in earnings. Jameela was the daughter of Rambuntious and Asbury Mary and was foaled in 1976. She was retired after four seasons with career earnings of $1,038,704. She finished fourth or better in 52 of her 58 starts. She was raced during part of her career by her breeder, Betty Worthington of Bel Air, Maryland. Jameela was sold to Peter Brant in 1981 for $804,0000. The two-time Maryland-bred Horse of the Year (1981 and 1982) won 16 stakes races, including Grade 1 victories in the Maskette Stakes, the Ladies Handicap and the Delaware Handicap.

Jameela was retired after the 1982 season. She produced two foals for Brant, both by Mr. Prospector before she died of colic in 1985. Her very first foal, Gulch, earned over $3 million, won the Breeders' Cup Sprint (Grade 1) and was named the Eclipse-Award-winning sprinter of the year. Gulch went on to become one of the nation's most respected sires. His sons included champion 3 year-old Thunder Gulch and Preakness Stakes winner and Horse of the Year winner Point Given.

The Jameela Stakes was run on the main track between 1983–2004 and in 2011. The race was run exclusively for 3 year-old fillies from 1986–2004. The Jameela Stakes was run at Pimlico Race Course from 1983–1985 and in 2001.

Records

Speed record: 
 6 furlongs – 1:07.20 – Jazzy Idea  (2012)
 7 furlongs – 1:24.40 – Silmaril (2004) & Boxer Girl  (2003)
  mile – 1:44.00 – Sham Say  (1988)
Most wins by a horse
 2 – Madame Giry (2013 & 2014)

Most wins by a jockey:
 3 – Rick Wilson (1994, 1995 & 2001)
 3 – Mario Pino (1987, 1997 & 2002)

Most wins by a trainer:
 2 – Cam Gambolati    (2013 & 2014)
 2 – Carlos A. Garcia    (1994 & 1995)

Winners of the Jameela Stakes since 1983

References

1983 establishments in Maryland
Laurel Park Racecourse
Horse races in Maryland
Recurring sporting events established in 1983